Meike Uiterwijk Winkel (born 4 December 1999) is a Dutch professional racing cyclist, who last rode for the UCI Women's Team  during the 2019 women's road cycling season.

References

External links

1999 births
Living people
Dutch female cyclists
Place of birth missing (living people)